All Saints’ Church, Tuckingmill is a Grade II listed parish church in the Church of England in Pendarves Street, Tuckingmill, Camborne, Cornwall.

History
The foundation stone for the new church was laid with the following inscription The foundation stone of this Church, dedicated to All Saints, was laid to the Glory of God and for the Salvation of Man, by the Rt. Hon. the Baroness Basset of Tehidy, on 31st day of August 1843.

The parish church of All Saints was built in the Norman Revival style, with the north aisle having a heavy granite arcade. The architect was John Hayward of Exeter. The Norman font came from the chapel at Menadarva.  It was consecrated by the Lord Bishop of Exeter on 21 July 1845.

The church was renovated in 1875–79 by Piers St Aubyn with the raising and tiling of the chancel, removing the tower gallery, replacing the seats and repairing the walls and windows. The contractor was Mr. W. May of Pool.

A reredos with an ″Irish serpentine″ border, inlaid with marble and also designed by Mr Piers St Aubyn was completed in November 1882. The cross is made of alabaster. The church was re-opened on Thursday, 20 February 1879.

Parish status
The church is in a joint benefice with:
St Martin and St Meriadoc’s Church, Camborne
Holy Trinity Church, Penponds

Stained glass
The east window dates from 1847 and was designed by Joseph Bell. The rest of the stained glass is from the 1890s by Fouracre and Watson or Fouracre and Son of Plymouth.

Organ
A new organ, costing £120, of nine speaking stops was purchased from Hele and Sons of Plymouth in 1879. A specification of the organ can be found in the National Pipe Organ Register.

Bells
The peal of eight bells in the tower comprises 8 by John Taylor and Company. Originally installed as a ring of 6 in 1931, the ring was expanded with the addition of two bells in 1936.

References

Tuckingmill
Tuckingmill
Churches completed in 1845
Camborne